Stephen David Jelley (born 12 May 1982) is a British auto racing driver.

Career

Single-seaters
Born in Leicester, Jelley moved up from Formula Ford to the National Class of the British Formula 3 Championship for 2004, taking three class wins. In 2006 and 2007 he drove for Räikkönen Robertson Racing in British F3. After a second place in the 2007 opening round, he took two wins and finished 3rd overall. He contested the 2008 GP2 Asia Series season for the ART Grand Prix team.

Touring cars

Jelley switched to touring cars after his GP2 Asia campaign contesting the 2008 British Touring Car Championship with Team RAC as Colin Turkington's team-mate. His last GP2 Asia weekend clashed with the second BTCC meeting of the year at Rockingham meaning a GP2 race in Dubai on the Friday and BTCC qualifying at Rockingham on the Saturday. Early results were not impressive, with only one point in the first 4 meetings, results gradually improved with points finishes in each of the next 3 meetings, At Silverstone he qualified seventh, but after finishing there in round 25, he crashed in round 26, dislocating his shoulder. Despite this injury he did contest round 27, finishing in the points. At the Brands Hatch season finale, he took pole position, although as he explained to ITV4, the team did not initially believe he had set the fastest time, and attributed seeing P1 on the screen to a timing error. In the race his gearbox failed, but he fought back to score minor points in the final round. For 2009 he continued with Team RAC and showed he had benefited from a years knowledge by finishing fourth (a then personal best) at the first round at Brands Hatch. Results continued to improve and at the halfway point of the 2009 season, Jelley took two-second-place finishes and a third position in the third race at Croft to clinch his first podium finishes in the sport. This was followed up at Rockingham with two wins one in race 1 from a starting position of fourth and one in race three again from fourth.

Porsche Carrera Cup
Jelley switched to the British Porsche Carrera Cup for 2010, driving for Team Parker Racing. He had a consistent season, taking 11 podium finishes (including wins in the final two races), and finished third in the championship, behind Tim Harvey and Michael Caine, but ahead of his team-mates.

Jelley remained in the series with the same team for 2011, this was a late change as he had initially agreed to drive in the 2011 Le Mans Series. Jelley took pole position for the season's first two races at Brands Hatch, leading the first until a mistake (that he attributed to a slightly different braking performance of the new car) dropped him to third. He rectified this in the second event, winning from team mate Euan Hankey. Throughout the season Jelley fought with the two SAS backed cars of James Sutton and Michael Meadows, they went into the final meeting of the year tied on points. A fuel pick up problem in qualifying resulted in a frustrating 7th and 9th positions, Jelley managed to race to 4th place before slight contact with the rear of Meadows's car resulted in a punctured radiator ending his championship chances. Over the year Jelley recorded 5 wins. Jelley's overtaking performances through the year were praised by Autosport Magazine (17 Nov 2011) as he was seen to make more positions than any other driver.

Avon Tyres British GT Championship

As well as the 2011 Carrera Cup GB Jelley competed in Two British GT Races for Trackspeed Racing at the wheel of a Porsche GT3R partnering David Ashburn. The pair also entered the International GT Open event at Brands Hatch. The highlight of these was Jelley setting Pole position for the British GT Donington 3-hour event, the pair finished 4th in the event. In 2012 Jelley competed in three rounds of the British GT Championship with Motorbase Performance driving a Porsche GT3R alongside businessman Steve Parish (Rockingham, Brands Hatch, and Donington.) He claimed Pole position for the Rockingham and Brands Hatch rounds.

Blancpain Endurance Series
During 2012 Jelley drove for Von Ryan Racing in the Blancpain Endurance Series in a McLaren MP4-12C GT3 alongside brothers Matt and Julien Draper. This included the Spa 24h race.

Return to BTCC 2017 
Following 2 years driving for Team Parker Racing in the Porsche Carrera Cup GB Jelley returned to the British Touring Car Championship with the team driving a Ford Focus. The team struggled for pace and finished the season with only 2 points.

For 2018, the team switched to an ex-WSR BMW 125i. The season was again a disappointment, with Jelley suffering bad luck on several occasions. His best meeting of the year was Knockhill, where he qualified second and was running in that position until getting punted by ex-teammate Colin Turkington.

Jelley remained with Team Parker and BMW for 2019. He immediately picked up his best result since his return to the championship, finishing on the podium in race 3 at Brands Hatch. At round 5, Jelley finished race 3 in second place on the road, but was promoted to first after a 20-second penalty was awarded to original winner Jake Hill.

Racing record

Complete Formula 3 Euro Series results
(key)

Complete GP2 Asia Series results 
(key)

Complete British Touring Car Championship results
(key) (Races in bold indicate pole position – 1 point awarded in first race; races in italics indicate fastest lap – 1 point awarded all races; * signifies that driver lead race for at least one lap – 1 point given all races)

References

External links

Profile at BTCC Action.co.uk
Career BTCC Results
Complete Career Results

1982 births
British Formula Three Championship drivers
British Touring Car Championship drivers
English racing drivers
Living people
GP2 Asia Series drivers
Blancpain Endurance Series drivers
24 Hours of Spa drivers
Porsche Carrera Cup GB drivers
ART Grand Prix drivers
BMW M drivers
Performance Racing drivers
Double R Racing drivers
Fortec Motorsport drivers